CANA or Cana may refer to:

Cana
Cana may refer to:

Places

Biblical
Kanah, town and brook mentioned in the Book of Joshua of the Hebrew Bible (see Wadi Qana)
Cana, village mentioned in the Gospel of John as "Cana of Galilee", site of the Marriage at Cana
'Ain Kanah, spring at Reineh, Israel, associated with the Marriage at Cana
Kafr Kanna, village in Israel often associated with the Marriage at Cana
Khirbet Qana, archaeological site in Israel associated with the Marriage at Cana
Qana, village in Lebanon associated with the Marriage at Cana

Middle East
Cana, Yemen, ancient port city in Yemen, mainly a trading port of spices from India and Eastern coast of Africa

North America
Rural Municipality of Cana No. 214, Saskatchewan, Canada
Cana, California, USA; community in Butte County
Cana, Virginia, USA; an unincorporated community
Cana Island, in Lake Michigan located near Baileys Harbor, WI
Punta Cana, a town in the Dominican Republic

Europe
Čaňa, municipality in the Košice Region of eastern Slovakia
Cana, Tuscany, a village in Grosseto, Tuscany, Italy

Other uses
Marriage at Cana, Biblical event
The Wedding at Cana, painting by Italian artist Paolo Veronese
Lorik Cana, Albanian footballer
Cana (length), unit of measurement
 Cana (radiolarian), a genus
 cana, a species name
 Vulpes cana is the binomial name of Blanford's fox

CANA
CANA may refer to:

African Swimming Confederation (abbreviated: CANA)
Caribbean News Agency
Convulsive Antidote, Nerve Agent, United States military acronym for "Convulsive Antidote, Nerve Agent", the drug diazepam in injectable form
Convocation of Anglicans in North America
Argentine Naval Aviation (CANA)

See also

Canae, Island of Argennusa; a city in antiquity
 Including use as a species name

Caña (disambiguation)
Canas (disambiguation)
Canna (disambiguation)
Kana (disambiguation)
Qana
Wadi Qana